The Nyambo, or Ragwe, are a Bantu ethnic and linguistic group based in the Karagwe District of Kagera Region in far northwestern Tanzania.  The Nyambo population is estimated to number 670,000. Their closest relatives are the Haya people.

References

 Josephat M. Rugemalira (2005). A Grammar of Runyambo. Languages of Tanzania Project. .

Ethnic groups in Tanzania
Languages of Tanzania
Great Lakes Bantu languages